The 2018 AFF U-16 Girls' Championship was the 3rd edition of the AFF U-16 Girl's Championship, an international women's football tournament organised by the ASEAN Football Federation (AFF). The tournament was hosted by Indonesia from 1 to 13 May 2018.The defending champion was Thailand. They managed to retain their title.

Venue

Group stage
The top two teams of each group advanced to the semi-finals. 
All times listed are Indonesia Western Standard Time (UTC+07:00)

Group A

Group B

Knockout stage
In the knockout stage, the penalty shoot-outs are used to decide the winner if necessary (extra time is not used).

Semi-finals

Third place match

Final

Winner

Goalscorers
9 goals
 Myat Noe Khin

7 goals
 Swe Mar Aung

6 goals
 Janista Jinantuya

3 goals

 Inthida Khounsy
 Ain Nur Qaseh Azman
 Danh Thang Thao
 Vu Thi Hoa

2 goals

 Firanda Firanda
 Pe Pe
 Maria Diaz Laso
 Nurhidayu Naszri
 Putri Nur Syaliza Sazali

1 goals

 Y. Raksmey
 Jasmine Sefia Waynie Cahyono
 Pimpha Thongsavang
 Ayuna Anjani Lamsin
 Hellma Melly
 Nur Mecca Rania Mohd Hazri
 Win Win
 Nur Atikah Ardini Salleh
 Chattaya Pratumkul
 Pluemjai Sontisawat
 Suchada Khamjaroen
 Yadaporn Meelun
 Ho Thi Kim En

Own goal
 Isis Ang (playing against Vietnam)

References

W
2018
AFF U-16 Girls' Championship
International association football competitions hosted by Indonesia
2018 in women's association football